Maria Kuncewiczowa (Samara, Russian Empire, 30 October 1895 - 15 July 1989, Lublin, Poland) was a Polish writer and novelist. Kuncewiczowa's works span from short stories to novels to radio novels to literary diaries.

Early life 
Maria Kuncewiczowa was born on October 30, 1895 in Samara, Russian Empire. Her parents had been exiled to Russia for involvement in the January 1863 Polish Insurrection, and the family returned to Warsaw when she was 2 years old. Her parents were members of the Polish intelligentsia class, or the impoverished educated class. Her mother was a violist who gave up her career to raise a family, which was one thing that drew Kuncewiczowa to music in her early life. She studied music and literature in Kraków, Warsaw and Paris before she chose a literary vocation.

Kuncewiczowa, née Szczepańska, married Jerzy Kuncewicz, a Polish lawyer, writer, and activist, in 1921, and one year later, gave birth to her son, Witold Kuncewicz.

Career in Poland 
Kuncewiczowa published her first work, Pro Arte et Studio, in 1918 under her maiden name. She had published under pseudonyms for the magazine Le Lierre. Kuncewiczowa began working with the Polish PEN Club in the early 1920s, publishing translations of major works in foreign languages. Kuncewiczowa remained an active member of the PEN Club for the rest of her life.

Kuncewiczowa's major breakout was in 1927 when she published her first collection of short stories, Przymierze z Dzieckiem (Covenant With a Child), which is a collection that explores birth, motherhood, the connection between a mother and her child. These stories remain true to Kuncewiczowa's later exploration of themes concerning the psychology of women, ideas of femininity, and motherhood. Her second major work, Twarz Męzczyzny (A Man's Face, 1928), deals with similar issues of femininity, desire, and sexuality.

Kuncewiczowa's most popular work is Cudzoziemka (The Stranger, 1936), which was translated into several foreign languages and quickly gained her national and international recognition. She drew inspiration for this novel from her mother, who gave up her career as a violinist to raise a family.

In 1938, she was awarded the Gold Laurel (Złoty Wawrzyn) of the Polish Academy of Literature.

World War II 
Kuncewiczowa left Poland with her husband in 1939 after the German invasion. Before she left Poland, however, Kuncewiczowa became the first Polish author to publish a radio novel, releasing both Dni powszednie państwa Kowalskich and Kowalscy się odnaleźli in 1938. After she left, she traveled to Paris and England, where she wrote Klucze (The Keys, 1943), a literary diary about her struggles being displaced during World War II.

Eventually, Kuncewiczowa and her husband moved to the United States in 1956, where she taught Polish language and literature at the University of Chicago. From 1962 to 1968, she lectured at the University of Chicago.  She spent 1927–1939 and her last years from 1969 in Kazimierz nad Wisłą. From 1970 to 1984, during winter time, she lived in Italy. Kuncewiczowa and her husband moved back to Poland in 1970, where she wrote two autobiographical works, Fantomy (Phantoms, 1971) and Natura (Nature, 1972).

Honors 
In 1989, the University of Maria Curie-Sklodowska awarded her the title of doctor honoris causa.

Selected works
Dwa księżyce, Rój, Warszawa 1933; Warszawa: Prószyński i S-ka, 1999. 
Cudzoziemka, 1936; Warszawa : Wydawnictwo Pi, 2013. 
The stranger, London: Hutchinson International Authors, 1947. 
 Zmowa nieobecnych 1946; Warszawa : Instytut Wydawniczy Pax, 1978. 
 The conspiracy of the absent, a novel. New York, Roy, 195- 
 Leśnik, 1952
 The forester : a novel, New York : Roy Publishers, 1954. 
 Gaj oliwny, 1961; Lublin : Wydawn. Lubelskie, 1990. 
 Tristan 1946, 1967; Bratislava : Tatran, 1972.

References

1895 births
1989 deaths
Writers from Warsaw
Polish women writers
Golden Laurel of the Polish Academy of Literature
Recipients of the State Award Badge (Poland)